Justin Najmy (1898 - 1968) was the first bishop for the United States in the Melkite Greek Catholic Church.  Appointed exarch for the newly created Melkite diocese in the United States, Bishop Najmy served for two years before his death at age 70.

Biography 
Justin Abraham Najmy was born on April 23, 1898. He joined the Basilian Aleppian Order, studied at the seminary at Deir-ech-Chir and at the Propaganda Fidei, and was ordained a priest in Rome on December 25, 1926.

Moving to the United States, he served as pastor of St. Basil the Great Church in Central Falls, Rhode Island before his appointment as apostolic exarch by Pope Paul VI on January 27, 1966. The appointment of Najmy as exarch at first drew protest from the Melkite patriarch Maximos IV, because he and the Synod of the Melkite Church had chosen a different candidate, and the appointment, decided by the Sacred Congregation for the Eastern Churches, made the new Exarch subject to the Holy See, and only responsible to the Patriarch and the Synod in liturgical matters.

On May 29, 1966, in a ceremony at the Cathedral of the Holy Cross in Boston, Najmy was consecrated a bishop by Athanasios Toutoungi, archbishop of Aleppo, his former seminary colleague, and received the title of titular bishop of Augustopolis-in-Phrygia. The following month he was formally enthroned as exarch. He established his episcopal see at the Church of the Annunciation in suburban Boston, which became the cathedral for the newly created Apostolic Exarchate of United States of America, Faithful of the Oriental Rite (Melkite).

In the wake of the Six-Day War in June 1967, Najmy welcomed the bishops of Middle Eastern churches in the United States for a meeting in Boston. Bishops of the Antiochian Orthodox Church, the Maronite Catholic Church, and from Armenian and Syrian churches attended.

Bishop Najmy did not serve as exarch for long. He died of a heart attack on June 11, 1968 and was succeeded by Joseph Tawil. He is buried at the parish cemetery of St. Basil the Great in Cumberland, Rhode Island.

See also
Melkite Greek Catholic Eparchy of Newton
Melkite Greek Catholic Church
Maximos IV Sayegh

Notes

External links
 Melkite Greek Catholic Patriarchate of Antioch, Alexandria and Jerusalem
 Official Website of the Melkite Church in the US.
 Extensive history of the Melkite Church

American people of Arab descent
American Melkite Greek Catholic bishops
American Eastern Catholics
1898 births
1968 deaths
Melkite Greek Catholic bishops
Burials in Rhode Island
20th-century American clergy